Dalkowo  is a village in the administrative district of Gmina Więcbork, within Sępólno County, Kuyavian-Pomeranian Voivodeship, in north-central Poland.

References

Dalkowo